Jerry Nissen (c. 1884 – April 18, 1954) was an American football player and coach. He served as the head football coach at the University of Montana from 1915 to 1917, compiling a record of 7–7–3. Nissen was also the head basketball coach at Montana from 1914 to 1918, tallying a mark of 21–16. Nissen played college football at Washington State University. He was an assistant football coach at the University of Idaho from 1908 to 1909 and at his alma mater, Washington State, in 1913.

After leaving coaching, Nissen worked as an inspector for the Washington State Department of Highways, retiring around 1951. He died at the age of 69, on April 18, 1954, in Seattle, Washington, following a long illness.

Head coaching record

Football

References

Year of birth missing
1880s births
1954 deaths
American football halfbacks
Basketball coaches from Washington (state)
Idaho Vandals football coaches
Montana Grizzlies basketball coaches
Montana Grizzlies football coaches
Washington State Cougars football coaches
Washington State Cougars football players
Sportspeople from Kent, Washington
Players of American football from Washington (state)